Rakia is a popular alcoholic drink in the Balkans

Rakia may also refer to:
RAKIA, or Ras Al Khaimah Investment Authority, a government-owned entity for promoting incoming investments in the United Arab Emirates
Rakia Rezgui (born 1996), Tunisian handball player
"Rakia" is the name of Eytan Stibbe's mission at the International Space Station

See also